RSWM Limited is an Indian textile company which manufactures synthetic and blended spun yarns. Its headquartered in Noida, Uttar Pradesh having registered office in Kharigram, Rajasthan. It is a flagship company of LNJ Bhilwara group.

RSWM is a listed company in National Stock Exchange and Bombay Stock Exchange.

History
RSWM Limited was established in 1960 as Rajasthan Spinning & Weaving Mills Limited at Calcutta, India. In 1980, the company Collaborated with Zwicky & Co., Switzerland to manufacture of polyester sewing thread with an annual capacity of 120 tonnes.

In 1992, RSWM signed a MoU with Madhya Pradesh Government for beneficiation of 2000 TPD of rock phosphate. In the year 1995 RSWM partnered with Canadian company Dominion Textile for manufacturing high value added Denim.

In 1997, the company setup two power plants of capacity 4.2 MW each at Gulabpura and Banswara. In 2000, RSWM signed agreements with National Securities Depository Limited and Central Depository Services to facilitate all types of investors to hold and trade in the company's equity shares in electronic mode. In 2006, the company change its name from Rajasthan Spg. & Wvg. Mills Limited to RSWM Limited.

In 2020, RSWM Ltd. partnered with the Swiss company HeiQ under its brand Mayur Suitings. Later in 2021, Mayur Suitings was acquired by Indian textile company DONEAR Industries.

Awards
Rajiv Gandhi National Quality Award for the year 2007 (Fourteenth Awards)

References 

Clothing retailers of India
Indian companies established in 1960
Companies listed on the National Stock Exchange of India
Companies listed on the Bombay Stock Exchange